James Samuel "Jimmy Jam" Harris III (born June 6, 1959) and Terry Steven Lewis (born November 24, 1956) are an American R&B/pop songwriting and record production team. They have enjoyed great success since the 1980s with various artists, most intensively with Janet Jackson. They have written 31 top ten hits in the UK and 41 in the US. In 2022, the duo were inducted into the Rock and Roll Hall of Fame in the Musical Excellence category.

History
Jimmy Jam is the son of Cornbread Harris, a Minneapolis blues and jazz musician. Jimmy Jam met Lewis while he was a student at Washburn High School in Minneapolis. They did not meet in class, however, but while attending a TRIO Upward Bound program on the University of Minnesota campus.

Harris formed or joined an 11 piece band called Mind & Matter.

Later came Flyte Tyme, which evolved into the Time. In 1981, they were joined by Morris Day and toured with Prince as his opening act. As members of the Time, they played instruments on all but one of the group's five albums (Ice Cream Castle), including Condensate which the group recorded as the Original 7ven.

In 1982, Jimmy Jam and Terry Lewis were introduced to the music executive Dina R. Andrews, who was then an employee of Dick Griffey's SOLAR Records, where they would be mentored by record producer Leon Sylvers III. The pair asked Andrews to manage them, and through her relationships Andrews first introduced Jam and Lewis to Music Executive Clarence Avant.  They produced their first masters for Avant for the S.O.S. Band.  Andrews set-up Jam and Lewis's company Flyte Tyme Productions as a business entity, and continued shopping them to her other record executive colleagues.  The producers went on to produce several other masters for Avant under Dina Andrews Management for the S.O.S. Band, Cherrelle, Alexander O'Neal and Change. Additionally, Andrews shopped the duo to many of the executives and artists who used their services, such as Klymaxx, Cheryl Lynn ("Encore"), and executives such as John McClain (Janet Jackson).

The pair were fired by Prince from a tour after a blizzard left them unable to rejoin during a short break to produce music for the S.O.S. Band.  However, one of the tracks they were producing, "Just Be Good to Me", became a hit and sealed the duo's reputation, as well as that of the S.O.S. Band. The duo would rejoin the Time for two albums: 1990's Pandemonium and the 2011 album Condensate under the name the Original 7ven.

The duo was noted for early use of the Roland TR-808 drum machine, which was used in most of its productions. After working with other artists such as Cherrelle and Alexander O'Neal, Jam and Lewis were introduced to Janet Jackson and produced her breakthrough album Control in 1986, for which the duo won a Grammy Award. Their collaboration on her next album, 1989's Rhythm Nation 1814, proved even more successful as the album became one of the top-selling albums in history with four Billboard Hot 100 No. 1 hits. Their collaboration continued and remained highly successful, especially on the Billboard 200 No.1 albums janet., The Velvet Rope, All For You and Unbreakable.

In 1991, they founded a record label, Perspective Records - an A&M Records distributed label that has since been closed and then reactivated. Later that year, their newly minted label experienced success with a Minneapolis-based gospel/R&B collective of artists known as Sounds of Blackness. Their debut single, "Optimistic", served as a groundbreaking anthem stressing positivity and encouragement. The song served as a summer and fall anthem and began propelling Jam and Lewis' new boutique label towards the top. Other successes followed with Blackness as well as music from labelmates Mint Condition, Lo-Key? and Solo. A highlight for Perspective was the opportunity to release the soundtrack for the 1992 motion picture Mo Money, which starred Damon Wayans, Stacey Dash and Marlon Wayans. Executive produced by Jam and Lewis, the soundtrack featured cuts from Mint Condition, Ralph Tresvant and Caron Wheeler, as well as a duet by Janet Jackson and Luther Vandross.

In an illustrious career that has spanned more than three decades, Jam and Lewis have worked with artists such as Lionel Richie, Herb Alpert, TLC, Sounds of Blackness, Yolanda Adams, Jordan Knight, Michael Jackson, Aretha Franklin, Boyz II Men, Usher, Johnny Gill, Patti LaBelle, Mary J. Blige, Chaka Khan, Mariah Carey, Prince, Mýa, Bryan Adams, Spice Girls, Vanessa Williams, George Michael, Melanie B, Rod Stewart, Kelly Price, Gwen Stefani, New Edition, Eric Benet, Pia Zadora, SOLO, and the Human League. In 1999, they produced the hit "Open My Heart" by Yolanda Adams which helped her popularity.

Terry Lewis married R&B singer Karyn White, with whom he had a daughter, Ashley Nicole Lewis, in 1992. The pair has since divorced.  He later married Indira Singh and had two children. Jimmy Jam served as chairman of the board of the National Academy of Recording Arts and Sciences. He is currently listed as chairman Emeritus. Jimmy is married to Mexican-American businesswoman Lisa Padilla Harris.

In 2005 Jam and Lewis opened their new recording studios in Santa Monica, California naming it Flyte Tyme West, later moving there full-time due to more opportunities for work and collaboration. In 2006, they won a Grammy for Yolanda Adams' song "Be Blessed", from her 2005 album Day By Day. In 2007, Jam and Lewis produced the two-time Grammy Award-winning CD Funk This for Chaka Khan, which included the Award-winning R&B duet "Disrespectful", with Mary J. Blige.

The production duo reunited with the Time at the 50th Grammy Awards on February 10, 2008, in a medley that included the artist Rihanna, and featuring "Jungle Love".  In June and July 2008, all of the original members of the Time (Morris Day, Jimmy Jam, Terry Lewis, Jesse Johnson, Jerome Benton, Jellybean Johnson, and Monte Moir) reunited once again for a series of shows at the Flamingo Hotel and Casino in Las Vegas.

Jam and Lewis worked on Ruben Studdard's album, Love Is as well as Johnny Gill's 2011 album Still Winning. Their most recent hits as producers were "Pure Gold" from Earth, Wind & Fire's 2005 album Illumination and "Higher Than This" from Ledisi's 2009 album Turn Me Loose.

Discography

Studio albums

Singles

Charts
They have produced 16 Billboard Hot 100 No. 1 hits, and 26 Billboard R&B No. 1 hits.

They are among a handful of producers to have No. 1 records in three consecutive decades, with number ones in the 1980s, 1990s, and 2000s.

They have had 41 songs reach the Top 10 of the Billboard Hot 100, and 31 in the top 10 in the UK.

Billboard Hot 100 No. 1s

 Janet Jackson:
 "When I Think of You"
 "Miss You Much"
 "Escapade"
 "Love Will Never Do (Without You)"
 "That's the Way Love Goes"
 "Again"
 "Together Again"
 "Doesn't Really Matter"
 "All for You"
 The Human League - "Human"
 George Michael -  "Monkey"
 Karyn White - "Romantic"
 Boyz II Men:
 "On Bended Knee" 
 "4 Seasons of Loneliness"
 Mariah Carey - "Thank God I Found You" (featuring Joe & 98 Degrees)
 Usher - "U Remind Me"

Awards
Since forming their music company Flyte Tyme in 1982, Jam & Lewis have earned more than 100 gold, platinum, multi-platinum and diamond albums for their work with such artists as Janet Jackson, Michael Jackson, Boyz II Men, Usher, Mary J. Blige, Mariah Carey, Luther Vandross, Yolanda Adams, Herb Alpert, New Edition, Human League, George Michael, Earth, Wind and Fire, TLC, Robert Palmer, Gwen Stefani and Kanye West. They have more than 100 ASCAP songwriting and publishing awards, including several Songwriter of the Year awards.

In 1993, Jam & Lewis were nominated with Janet Jackson for an Academy Award for Best Original Song for "Again", from the movie Poetic Justice.

In 2020 Jam & Lewis were nominated with Sheila E. for an Primetime Emmy Award for Outstanding Music Direction for the TV special Let's Go Crazy: The Grammy Salute to Prince.

Grammy Awards
Jam & Lewis have won five Grammy Awards. They have received the most nominations for Producer of the Year, with 11 nominations. They won the award in 1987 at the 29th Grammy Awards, in the first year they were nominated.

|-
| align="center" rowspan="3"| 1987
| Control
| Album of the Year
| 
|-
|"What Have You Done For Me Lately"
| Best R&B Song
| 
|-
| Jimmy Jam & Terry Lewis
| Producer of the Year, Non-Classical
| 
|-
| align="center" rowspan="3"| 1990
| Janet Jackson's Rhythm Nation 1814
| Best Instrumental Arrangement Accompanying Vocals
| 
|-
| "Miss You Much"
| Best R&B Song
| 
|-
| Jimmy Jam & Terry Lewis and Janet Jackson
| Producer of the Year, Non-Classical
| 
|-
| align="center"| 1991
| "Alright"
| Best R&B Song
| 
|-
| align="center" rowspan="2"| 1994
| "That's the Way Love Goes"
| Best R&B Song
| 
|-
| Jimmy Jam & Terry Lewis
| Producer of the Year, Non-Classical
| 
|-
| align="center"| 1995
| Jimmy Jam & Terry Lewis
| Producer of the Year, Non-Classical
| 
|-
| align="center" rowspan="2"|1996
|HIStory: Past, Present and Future, Book I
| Album of the Year
| 
|-
| Jimmy Jam & Terry Lewis
| Producer of the Year, Non-Classical
| 
|-
| align="center"|2001
| Jimmy Jam & Terry Lewis
| Producer of the Year, Non-Classical
| 
|-
| align="center" rowspan="3"| 2002
|All For You
| Best Pop Vocal Album
| 
|-
|"All For You"
| Best Dance Recording
| 
|-
| Jimmy Jam & Terry Lewis
| Producer of the Year, Non-Classical
| 
|-
| align="center"|2003
| Jimmy Jam & Terry Lewis
| Producer of the Year, Non-Classical
| 
|-
| align="center"|2004
| Jimmy Jam & Terry Lewis
| Producer of the Year, Non-Classical
| 
|-
| align="center" rowspan="3"| 2005
| Confessions
| Album of the Year
| 
|-
|Damita Jo
| Best Contemporary R&B Album
| 
|-
| Jimmy Jam & Terry Lewis
| Producer of the Year, Non-Classical
| 
|-
| align="center" rowspan="3"| 2006
| Love. Angel. Music. Baby.
| Album of the Year
| 
|-
| "Be Blessed"
| Best Gospel Song
| 
|-
| Jimmy Jam & Terry Lewis
| Producer of the Year, Non-Classical
| 
|-
| align="center"| 2007
|20 Y.O.
| Best Contemporary R&B Album
| 
|-
| align="center"| 2008
|Funk This
| Best R&B Album
| 
|-
| align="center"| 2016
|Forever Charlie
| Best R&B Album
| 
|-
|}

References

External links
Flyte Tyme Productions
 
SoulMusic.com
BBC Interview, May 2005
Label: Perspective Records - Rate Your Music
  Le groupe SoulRnB.com consacré à Jimmy Jam & Terry Lewis

1956 births
1959 births
21st-century American keyboardists
American contemporary R&B musical groups
African-American guitarists
American male songwriters
African-American record producers
Record production duos
Midwest hip hop groups
American hip hop record producers
Musicians from Minnesota
American songwriting teams
American musical duos
Contemporary R&B duos
New jack swing music groups
Living people
The Original 7ven members
Musicians from Omaha, Nebraska
Grammy Award winners
The S.O.S. Band
American funk keyboardists
American funk bass guitarists
American male bass guitarists
American soul keyboardists
20th-century American keyboardists
African-American songwriters